Monochroa palustrellus, the wainscot neb, is a moth of the family Gelechiidae. It is found in from western, central and northern Europe to the Ural Mountains and southern Siberia. The habitat consists of 
waste ground, dry pastures and sand-dunes.

The wingspan is 17–19 mm. The forewings are yellowish white, covered with black lines. The hindwings are griseous (mottled grey). Adults are on wing from late June to August in one generation per year.

The larvae feed on Rumex species, including Rumex crispus, Rumex aquaticus and Rumex hydrolapathum. They feed in the stem, leaf petioles or rootstock.

References

Moths described in 1850
Monochroa
Moths of Europe